Statistics of Allsvenskan in season 1976.

Overview
The league was contested by 14 teams, with Halmstads BK winning the championship.

League table

Results

Footnotes

References 

Allsvenskan seasons
Swed
Swed
1